Harambaša was the rank for a senior commander of a hajduk band (brigand gangs).

Etymology
It is derived from Turkish word for bandit leader (- "Bandit" +   - "Head"), and was like some other Ottoman Turkish titles adopted into the irregular militias of Montenegrin, Serbian, Croatian rebels (bimbaša, serdar, buljubaša).

Usage
Montenegrin hajduks
Serbian hajduks
Military Frontier: Seressaners, Pandurs, and others.
Serbian Revolution, most of the supreme commanders were former harambaša's
Military of Principality of Montenegro
Serbian Orthodox tradition of Čuvari Hristovog Groba ("Keepers of Christ's Grave") in Vrlika, Croatia

See also
Harambašić, Serbian and Croatian surname
Hussar, Hungarian origin light cavalry in Europe, word meaning "the best of twenty" or in Slavic etymology "pirate"
Vojvoda, a civil and military administrator of Serbs in the Habsburg Monarchy
Korun Aramija
Ataman

References
Hanka Vajzović 1999, Orijentalizmi u književnom djelu: lingvistička analiza, : "harambaša m (tur. harami basi) = vođa hajduka, odmetnika,"
The Military Museum, 1968, Fourteen centuries of struggle for freedom, Belgrade (Serbia). Vojni muzej Jugoslovenske narodne armije, p. xxvii

Military ranks of Serbia
Turkish words and phrases
Serbo-Croatian words and phrases